The year 2015 is the 23rd year in the history of the K-1. 2015 starts with K-1 China vs. USA, and ends with K-1 World GP 2015 The Championship.

List of events

K-1 China vs. USA

K-1 China vs. USA was a kickboxing event held on January 1, 2015 at the Golden Eagle Culture City in Changsha, China.

Results

K-1 World GP 2015 -60kg Championship Tournament

K-1 World GP 2015 –60kg Championship Tournament was a kickboxing event held on January 18, 2015 at the Yoyogi National Gymnasium in Tokyo, Japan. This event featured 8-Man tournament for the inaugural K-1 -60kg Championship, and other super fights.

Results

K-1 World GP 2015 -60kg Championship Tournament bracket

1 Extra round

K-1 China vs. Japan

K-1 China vs. Japan was a kickboxing event held on February 1, 2015 at the Golden Eagle Culture City in Changsha, China.

Results

K-1 World GP 2015 -55kg Championship Tournament

K-1 World GP 2015 -55kg Championship Tournament was a kickboxing event held on April 19, 2015 at the Yoyogi National Gymnasium in Tokyo, Japan. This event featured 8-Man tournament for the inaugural K-1 -55kg Championship, and other super fights.

Results

K-1 World GP 2015 -55kg Championship Tournament bracket

1 Extra round

K-1 World GP 2015 -70kg Championship Tournament

K-1 World GP 2015 -70kg Championship Tournament was a kickboxing event held on July 4, 2015 at the Yoyogi National Gymnasium in Tokyo, Japan. This event featured 8-Man tournament for the inaugural K-1 -70kg Championship, and other super fights.

Results

K-1 World GP 2015 -70kg Championship Tournament bracket

K-1 World GP 2015 Survival Wars

K-1 World GP 2015 Survival Wars was a kickboxing event held on September 22, 2015 at the Korakuen Hall in Tokyo, Japan.

Results

K-1 World GP 2015 The Championship

K-1 World GP 2015 The Championship was a kickboxing event held on November 21, 2015 at the Yoyogi National Gymnasium in Tokyo, Japan. This event was originally scheduled to feature 4 title fights for the K-1 -70kg, -65kg, -60kg and -55kg Championship, but -70kg Championship bout was cancelled due to challenger Sanny Dahlbeck having a fever.

Results

See also
List of K-1 events
List of K-1 champions
2015 in Glory
2015 in Kunlun Fight

References

K-1 events
K-1
K-1